Woodsburgh is a village in the Town of Hempstead in Nassau County, on the South Shore of Long Island, in New York, United States. The population was 778 at the 2010 United States Census.

Woodsburgh is included in the Five Towns (though not as one of the "five"), which is usually said to comprise the villages of Lawrence and Cedarhurst, the hamlets of Woodmere and Inwood, and the Hewletts (the villages of Hewlett Bay Park, Hewlett Harbor, and Hewlett Neck, and the hamlet of Hewlett), along with Woodsburgh.

History 
Woodsburgh incorporated as a village in 1912.

Geography

The village is located between Hewlett and Woodmere and borders the Atlantic Ocean to the south.

Demographics

At the 2000 census, there were 831 people, 257 households and 224 families residing in the village. The population density was 2,286.7 per square mile (891.3/km2). There were 268 housing units at an average density of 737.5 per square mile (287.4/km2). The racial makeup of the village was 98.44% White, 0.36% African American, 0.72% Asian, 0.36% from other races, and 0.12% from two or more races. Hispanic or Latino of any race were 2.17% of the population.

There were 257 households, of which 45.9% had children under the age of 18 living with them, 83.7% were married couples living together, 2.7% had a female householder with no husband present, and 12.8% were non-families. 12.1% of all households were made up of individuals, and 9.3% had someone living alone who was 65 years of age or older. The average household size was 3.23 and the average family size was 3.50.

33.1% of the population were under the age of 18, 5.9% from 18 to 24, 20.1% from 25 to 44, 28.3% from 45 to 64, and 12.6% who were 65 years of age or older. The median age was 41 years. For every 100 females, there were 99.3 males. For every 100 females age 18 and over, there were 91.1 males.

The median household income was $185,296 and the median family income was $189,227. Males had a median income of $100,000 compared with $60,833 for females. The per capita income for the village was $76,443. None of the families and 0.4% of the population were living below the poverty line, including no under eighteens and none of those over 64.

Government
Mayor: Lee A. Israel
Deputy Mayor: Jacob Harman
Trustees: Carl Cayne, Jacob Harman, Alan Hirmes, and Shira Hoschander
Village Justice: Brian Ziegler

Education

School districts 
The Incorporated Village of Woodsburgh is located within the boundaries of (and is thus served by) the Hewlett-Woodmere Union Free School District and the Lawrence Union Free School District; geographically, the total area covered by each district within the village is roughly even. As such, children who reside within Woodsburgh and attend public schools go to school in one of these two districts, depending on where they reside within the village.

Library districts 
Woodsburgh is located within the boundaries of (and is thus served by) the Peninsula Library District and the Hewlett-Woodmere Library District. These two districts serve the areas of the village located within the Lawrence Union Free School District and the Hewlett-Woodmere Union Free School District, respectively; the boundaries of these two districts roughly correspond with those of the two school districts within Woodsburgh.

References

External links

 Official website
 Woodsburgh: All Homes, and Fine Ones at That

Five Towns
Villages in New York (state)
Villages in Nassau County, New York
Populated coastal places in New York (state)